Acacia williamsonii, known colloquially as Whirrakee wattle, is a species of Acacia that is endemic to the Bendigo region of Victoria. Naturalised populations also exist in Southern and Northern NSW.

Description
Like most species of Acacia it has phyllodes rather than true leaves. It blooms between August and September producing spherical flower-heads that contain 15–20-flowered sub-densely packed bright golden flowers.

Distribution
It is endemic to parts of northern-central Victoria from around Inglewood in the south to Rushworth in the north with large populations found in the Whipstick Forest around Bendigo where it is found growing in stony gravel or clay-loam soils as a part of open Eucalyptus forest and mallee scrubland communities.

See also
 List of Acacia species

References

williamsonii
Fabales of Australia
Flora of New South Wales
Flora of Victoria (Australia)